Neera Yadav, originally from Bulandshahr, Uttar Pradesh, India, studied at Welham Girls' School, Dehradun. She was an officer of the Indian Administrative Service (IAS). She was part of the 1971 batch of service graduates. She is married to Mahendra Singh Yadav, an officer of the Indian Police Service who later resigned from the service to pursue his political career.

She has been posted at different positions in the bureaucracy in Uttar Pradesh. She shot into fame as district magistrate of Jaunpur district during flood crisis for her daring rescue operations. But later she was selected among the top three most corrupt IAS officers of Uttar Pradesh in a voting done by her own colleagues. She was appointed the Chief Secretary of Uttar Pradesh, later resigning the position after a decision by the Supreme Court of India, thus becoming the second IAS officer in succession after Akhand Pratap Singh to have done so.

Post retirement, she joined the Bharatiya Janata Party in 2009 but resigned after Media questions over the decision.

In December 2010 Yadav was sentenced to four years' rigorous imprisonment after being convicted of misusing her official position as IAS officer of Uttar Pradesh to fraudulently allot land in Noida to Flex Industries, owned by industrialist Ashok Chaturvedi.

On 20 November 2012 a special CBI court sentenced Neera Yadav to 3 years' imprisonment in the Noida plot scam that happened between 1993-1995. At that time she was serving as the Noida Authority CEO. Significantly, she fraudulently allotted one plot for herself, one for her husband and one each for her two daughters [a total of 4 plots for her and her family], knowing fully well that the rules allowed only one plot of land to one family.

On 2 August 2017 the Supreme Court of India sentenced Neera Yadav to two years' imprisonment in the Noida land allotment scam.

References

Year of birth missing (living people)
Living people
People from Bulandshahr
Indian prisoners and detainees
Corruption in Uttar Pradesh
Indian Administrative Service officers convicted of crimes
Criminals from Uttar Pradesh
Indian Administrative Service officers
Welham Girls' School alumni